David Wyndorf (born October 28, 1956) is an American musician who is the lead vocalist, rhythm guitarist and songwriter for rock band Monster Magnet. He is the frontman and only remaining original member of the band.

Career

Commercial success 
In the early 1980s, Wyndorf fronted a punk band called Shrapnel, who recorded two 45 singles ("Combat Love" and "Go Cruisin'") and a five-song self-titled EP on Elektra Records.

During most part of the 1990s, Wyndorf and Monster Magnet struggled for commercial success which they could not obtain because of their unfashionable retro-rock style. This changed in 1998, when Wyndorf took a 21-day trip to Las Vegas, Nevada, from which he drew inspiration to write the songs for Powertrip, which would be Monster Magnet's breakthrough album. His life following the release of Powertrip was his inspiration for God Says No.

Monolithic Baby! 

Wyndorf traveled to Los Angeles to work for the soundtrack of the movie Torque, which was entirely composed by him. During his stay in Los Angeles, he found inspiration for Monolithic Baby!, Monster Magnet's 2004 album.

Drug overdose and recovery 

On February 27, 2006, Wyndorf overdosed on prescription drugs. An upcoming European tour for Monster Magnet was subsequently canceled. His management released the following statement:

"The battle with one's inner demons is the most personal fight any of us can undertake. The fight is at times a lonely, confusing journey. On the evening of February 27, Dave Wyndorf suffered a setback in his own fight and was hospitalized due to a drug overdose. His full recovery is expected. We ask that all those he has encountered over the years or simply affected by his music to take a moment to think good thoughts of and for him and his family. With the grace of God and those who love him we are all confident that Dave will rebound from this setback and continue to play and make great rock and roll."

More than a year later, in September 2007, Wyndorf spoke to UK-based music journalist Dave Ling about his overdose. He stated that the problems began when he suffered with insomnia while touring. Instead of seeking help from mental health professionals, he made doctors give him anxiolytics which he began to use regularly. He says his medical help just made his mental problems go away for a little while, after which they'd come back strengthened. Feeling very weak one day, he consumed a full bottle of sleeping pills, causing the overdose.

4-Way Diablo 

After his overdose, Wyndorf began working on Monster Magnet's next album, 4-Way Diablo, which was released in November 2007. On some songs on the album he endeavored to share his recent difficulties with the listener, while other tracks exhibit a more optimistic side to reflect his improving health.

He currently has plans to enter the studio to record an as yet undisclosed album project. Wyndorf has previously revealed that he finds extensive touring increasingly less enjoyable. However, more recently, he has expressed interest in touring again – but only after having released a new album.

In June 2008, Monster Magnet performed at several European festivals, playing six shows in total, and returned to Europe at the end of 2008 to play 35 more dates, with Phil Caivano having returned to the band. No songs from the new album were played.

Monster Magnet played several shows in Australia at the end of 2009. After having worked in the studio the following year for their upcoming album entitled Mastermind, which was released in October 2010, the band embarked on a lengthy European tour to promote their eighth studio album. Throughout March 2011 Monster Magnet played  Australia once more, playing 35 minute sets at the national Soundwave festival.

Monster Magnet toured again in 2011–2012, performing their albums Dopes to Infinity and Spine of God in their entirety.

Personal life

Opinion on drugs 
Having spent most of his career writing about drugs, Wyndorf now upholds that drugs are not an inspiration for music nor a gateway into creativity. In a 1995 interview, Wyndorf stated that legalizing mushrooms in America might be a bad idea, stating "Americans have been so suppressed for so long that given that kind of freedom they would tend to abuse it."

References

External links 

 Official band website

1956 births
American heavy metal singers
American baritones
American multi-instrumentalists
Living people
Monster Magnet members
People from Red Bank, New Jersey
Singers from New Jersey
20th-century American singers
21st-century American singers
20th-century American male singers
21st-century American male singers